Kirari village is an urban village originally settled by Jat kings of Bharatpur State. It lies in the North West Part of Delhi. The surrounding area and some parts of the village itself are now heavily urbanized and industrialized although town has grown a lot in a past few years but the culture and spirit of the village with which it was established still exists.

Waves of migrants from Bihar and UP came in 1999s to 2020. A lot of migrants are now settled around the parts of the village they are hard working and prospering in almost every field including politics, the current MLA of Kirari is Rituraj Govind.

History 

Kirari first officially appeared as (khiraree) on the map found in the musty room of the National Archives of India which shows Delhi in 1807, shortly after the arrival of the British in 1803. It highlights the hierarchy of settlements, from small to larger villages.

On 15 August 1947, when India became independent, the Government of India formed the 'Matsya Union' by combining Alwar, Bharatpur, Dholpur and Karauli from the princely states of Rajputana and 'Rajasthan' by merging the remaining princely states. In June 1949, the four princely states of Matsya Union were also merged in Rajasthan.On behalf of the state of Bharatpur, the Matsyavajas Jat Dheeraj Mathur and Natha Mathur were appointed to conduct the court by making the ruler of five villages named Karala, Pansali, Punth Khurd, Kiradi, Hastasar near Delhi. The ruins of this office are still lying in Karaala. Settled in Kakana village (near Gohana) from this village itself.

Lateron Village Nithari was created from the Kirari.

Gallery

Demography
 India census, Kirari Suleman Nagar has a population of 154633 (2001). Males constitute 55% of the population and females 45%. Kirari Suleman Nagar has an average literacy rate of 49%, less than the national average of 59.5%: male literacy is 51%, and female literacy is 38%. In Kirari Suleman Nagar, 20% of the population is under 6 years of age. This is a census town in North West district in the Indian state of Delhi. Kirari Suleman Nagar Approved Residency by Aam Aadmi Party in 2017.

References 

Cities and towns in North West Delhi district
New Delhi